Sceptre is an Indian thrash metal band formed in 1998, in Mumbai. They draw their prime influences from bands such as Slayer, Pantera, Sepultura and Lamb of God.

Its current members include Gilroy Fernandes on guitars, Aniket Waghmode on drums, Janus Sayal on bass and Gary Gracious on vocals

In the recent years the band portrayed their cause for fighting violence against women in their album Age of Calamity.

Early years
Sceptre's original line up consisted of Teemeer, Amar Negi  Aniket and Janus. Ajay Kumaran Vispy Homavazir, Amar Negi, Sanju Aguiar, Frank Pawar and Samron Jude are all ex-members of Sceptre. 
Gilroy formerly played in Naked Earth, before shifting to Sceptre. Through the years, Sceptre gained popularity by performing in various concerts, including Independence Rock.

Discography

Sceptre
1)	 Nuclear	04:07	  
2)	 Revolution	04:55	  
3)	 Charred	03:55	 
4)	 Twilight's End

Now or Never
1)	 Oceans of Dreams	01:41	  
2)	 ...Incomplete	        03:55	  
3)	 Nuclear	        04:02	  
4)	 Now or Never	        03:43	  
5)	 Enemy	                04:52	  
6)	 Charred	        03:41	  
7)	 Twilight's End	        01:48	 
8)	 Quicksand	        04:11	  
9)	 Search         	05:20	 
10)	 Circles of Silence	03:23	 
11)	 Revolution	        04:02

Age of Calamity
1)	 Solitude	                        01:28	 
2)	 Age of Calamity	                04:05	 
3)	 Wrath of God	                        04:45	 
4)	 Prophesy Deceit	                03:38	 
5)	 Lake of the Traitor	                04:49	 
6)	 Fatal Delay	                        04:12	 
7)	 7 Seals	                        04:19	 
8)	 Parasites (of the State)	        03:29	 
9)	 Judgement Day (End - A New Beginning)	01:51	 
10)	 Lest We Forget (bonus track)	        06:04

See also
Indian rock
Kryptos (band)
Bhayanak Maut
Nicotine (band)
Inner Sanctum (band)
Scribe (band)
Demonic Resurrection

References

External links
 Metal Archives
 Reverbnation 

Indian heavy metal musical groups